The Llandyfriog transmitting station is a broadcasting and telecommunications facility located on high ground several kilometres east of the town of Newcastle Emlyn, Ceredigion, South Wales. It was built in 1980 to relay VHF radio and UHF television to Newcastle Emlyn and the area in general. The site has a 25 m self-standing lattice mast erected on land that is itself about 105 m above sea level and acts as an off-air television relay of Preseli, about 20 km to the west.

Since Winter 1981 Llandyfriog has transmitted FM radio, acting as an off-air relay of Blaenplwyf about 50 km to the north. In Spring 1983 the radio services were upgraded to stereo.

Currently, Llandyfriog transmitter provides DVB-T digital television to the area, along with FM radio.

Services listed by frequency

Analogue television

November 4th 1977 - November 1982
The station launched with just the original three channels.

November 1982 - November 1997
Being in Wales, when Channel 4 arrived in 1982, Llandyfriog transmitted the S4C variant.

November 1997 - 19 August 2009
Llandyfriog was the site of one of the UK's two self-help analogue Channel 5 transmitters.

Analogue and digital television

19 August 2009 - 16 September 2009
The UK's digital switchover commenced, mirroring the changes taking place at the parent transmitter at Preseli. Analogue BBC Two Wales closed on channel 28 and ITV1 Wales took over on that frequency for what would be its final 3 weeks of service, vacating channel 25 as it did so. The new digital BBC A multiplex started up at full power in 64-QAM mode on channel 25.

Digital television

23 September 2009 - present
All the analogue television services closed and the new digital multiplexes took over on channels 22 and 28.

Analogue radio (FM VHF)

Winter 1981 - present

See also
List of masts
List of radio stations in the United Kingdom
List of tallest buildings and structures in Great Britain

References

External links
 The Transmission Gallery: Photographs and Information
 The 'ukfree' listing for Llandyfriog

Transmitter sites in Wales